United Nations Security Council resolution1629, adopted unanimously on 30 September 2005, after considering the Statute of the International Criminal Tribunal for the former Yugoslavia (ICTY), the Council decided that Judge Christine Van Den Wyngaert could participate in the Mile Mrkšić case, before her elected term as permanent judge of the Tribunal had begun.

Wyngaert's term was due to begin on 17 November 2005, and the Mrkšić case was to commence on 3 October 2005.

See also
 List of United Nations Security Council Resolutions 1601 to 1700 (2005–2006)
 Yugoslav Wars

References

External links
 
Text of the Resolution at undocs.org

 1629
2005 in Serbia and Montenegro
 1629
September 2005 events